Anti-aging creams are predominantly moisturiser-based cosmeceutical skin care products marketed with the promise of making the consumer look younger by reducing, masking or preventing signs of skin aging. These signs are laxity (sagging), rhytids (wrinkles), and photoaging, which includes erythema (redness), dyspigmentation (brown discolorations), solar elastosis (yellowing), keratoses (abnormal growths), and poor texture. Anti-aging supplements are a set of ingestible products that are designed to reduce or diminish the effects of aging. This includes things such as vitamin supplements, powders and teas. They are designed to reduce or diminish the effects of aging. Many products seek to hide the effects of aging while others claim to alter the body's chemical balances to slow the physical effects of aging. A comprehensive grading scale for anti-aging of the skin has been validated and categorizes skin aging as: laxity (sagging), rhytids (wrinkles), and the various categories of photoaging, including erythema (redness), dyspigmentation (brown discolorations), solar elastosis (yellowing), keratoses (abnormal growths), and poor texture.

Despite great demand, many anti-aging products and treatments have not been proven to give lasting or major positive effects. One study found that the best performing creams reduced wrinkles by less than 10% over 12 weeks, which is not noticeable to the human eye. Another study found that cheap moisturisers were as effective as high-priced anti-wrinkle creams. A 2009 study at Manchester University, funded by the manufacturer of the cream, showed that a proprietary blend of ingredients had a positive effect after six months of daily application when extrapolated to a twelve month basis of comparison. The statistical methods used to show this have been criticized.

Traditionally, anti-aging creams have been marketed towards women, but products specifically targeting men are increasingly common. Marketing of anti-aging products has been criticized as reinforcing ageism, particularly against women. According to Toni Calasanti of Virginia Tech, anti-aging ads specifically reinforce the belief that older people should look like middle-aged people, and that old age comes with a loss of gender identity.

Ingredients 
Anti-aging creams may include conventional moisturising ingredients. They also usually contain specific ingredients claimed to have anti-aging properties, such as:
 Retinoids (for instance, in the form of retinyl palmitate). In various formulations it has been shown to reduce fine lines and pores.
 Epidermal growth factor, to stimulate cell renewal and collagen production in the skin, and strengthen elasticity and structure. In various research epidermal growth factor has been shown to reduce fine lines, wrinkles and sagging. It also has healing (wounds and burns) and anti-inflammatory properties when applied to skin.
Equol
 Alpha hydroxy acids (AHAs) and beta hydroxy acids or other chemical peels. These help to dissolve the intracellular "glue" that holds dead cells together on the skin. The use of this type of product on a daily basis gradually enhances the exfoliation of the epidermis. This exposes newer skin cells and can help improve appearance.  AHAs may irritate some skin, causing redness and flaking.
 Peptides, such as acetyl hexapeptide-3 (Argireline), Matryxil, and copper peptides.
 Coenzyme Q10
 Anti-oxidants are substances that may protect cells from the damage caused by unstable molecules known as free radicals. The studies so far are inconclusive, but generally don’t provide strong evidence that antioxidant supplements have a substantial impact on disease.
 Sunscreens provide a high level of UVA protection against the effects of UVA radiation, such as wrinkles.
 Vitamin C

References 

Ageing
Skin care
Cosmetics
Anti-aging substances